Eduardo Alvir Pacheco also known by his nickname, Eddie Pacheco, was a Filipino sportsman who has represented the Philippines both in international basketball and football.

Education
Pacheco attended elementary (1946-1950) and high school (1950-1954) San Beda College.

He took up B.S. Architecture at the University of Santo Tomas (1954-1958).

Football
Pacheco made into the Philippine national football team when he was a junior student at San Beda College. He was a member of the national team that participated at the 1954 Asian Games. He made a goal against Vietnam in a match that ended in a 2-3 defeat. He was named Mr. Football in 1954 by the Philippine Sportswriter Association. Pacheco decided to switch to basketball due for financial reasons.

Scores and results list the Philippines' goal tally first.

Basketball
Pacheco played for the Philippine national basketball team. He was part of the squad that participated at the 1960 (Rome). (In some references, he was listed as "Edgardo Pacheco" which was a typographical error that many references went with)

Pacheco was also part of the team that won gold at the 1962 Asian Games. Pacheco was named most outstanding basketball player by the Philippine Sportswriter Association in 1962. He  played in MICAA for the 7Up Bottlers, the Ysmael Steel Admirals, YCO Painters and the U/tex Weavers. Pacheco retired from competitive basketball in 1973.

Other sports
Pacheco was also a bowler (member of TBAM; Tenpin Bowlers Association of Makati) swimmer, volleyball player and track and field athlete.

Later life
After his retirement he became an area manager for Julius Rothschild Ltd. He made frequent trips abroad and continues to play basketball for recreation purposes. He also served as senior administrative officer at the Philippine Sports Commission under executive director Dr. Lucrecio Calo.

Death
Pacheco died in his sleep on December 9, 2009 due to cardiac arrest in a Quezon City apartment that he was renting. He was 73 years old at the time of his death.

Personal life
He had four children from a previous relationship; Eduardo Jr., Catherine, Elizabeth, and Joseph.

He married Maria Lourdes Marqueta on October 17, 1972.

He worked for the Philippine Sports Commission up until the time of his demise as a Consultant.

References

External links
 

1936 births
2009 deaths
Filipino footballers
Philippines international footballers
Philippines men's national basketball team players
Filipino men's basketball players
Footballers at the 1954 Asian Games
Asian Games medalists in basketball
Basketball players at the 1962 Asian Games
Basketball players at the 1960 Summer Olympics
Olympic basketball players of the Philippines
UST Growling Tigers basketball players
Basketball players from Manila
Guards (basketball)
Asian Games gold medalists for the Philippines
Medalists at the 1962 Asian Games
Association footballers not categorized by position
Footballers at the 1958 Asian Games